The Hsinchu Fish Harbor or Nanliao Harbor is a fishing port in North District, Hsinchu City, Taiwan.

History
The harbor was originally built in the 1980s to give conveniences to the local fishermen to catch fishes. However, due to the decreasing amount of fish load over the years, the old harbor was replaced by the new harbor buildings which is more tourism-focused.

Activities

The harbor is the center for seafood business. It houses the Hsinchu Fishermen's Association since 1991, which has since become an important place for local residence to buy seafood. The trading is housed in the Hsinchu Seafood Wholesale Center, a two-story building, in which the ground level houses the trading activities of seafood and the upper level houses the food market.

Activities that can be done around the harbor area are cycling, kite flying and eating seafood.

Transportation
The harbor is accessible north west from Hsinchu Station of Taiwan Railways.

See also
 Hsinchu

References

External links

 

Ports and harbors of Hsinchu